Cecil Bryce (18 August 1911 – 8 February 1986) was an Australian cricketer. He played in one first-class match for Queensland in 1939/40.

See also
 List of Queensland first-class cricketers

References

External links
 

1911 births
1986 deaths
Australian cricketers
Queensland cricketers
People from Maryborough, Queensland
Cricketers from Queensland